Darren Chua (born 20 March 2000) is a Singaporean swimmer who competes internationally at the Southeast Asian Games and the Asian Games.

Career
In 2017, Darren has participated in major swim meets such as the 6th FINA World Junior Swimming Championship, 6th Commonwealth Youth Games and the 2017 FINA Swimming World Cup.

Darren competed at the 2018 Asian Games. Along with Joseph Schooling, Quah Zheng Wen and Darren Lim combined to bag a bronze in the men’s 4x100m freestyle relay at the Games, setting a new national record.

Darren made his Southeast Asian Games debut in 2019 and bagged five golds - two in individual events and three in relays and a silver. Darren claimed his first individual title at the SEA Games, clinching the gold medal in the men’s 200m freestyle on December 7 at the New Clark City Aquatics Center. He clocked a personal-best of 1min 48.26sec, just ahead of Malaysia’s Welson Sim (1:48.52). Vietnam’s Hoàng Quý Phước was third with his time of 1:48.59. It was Darren’s third gold at the Games, after wins in the 4x100m freestyle and 4x200m freestyle relays.

Chua upset defending champion Welson Sim in the 200m freestyle, then stunned defending champion Joseph Schooling in the 100m freestyle. 

Schooling’s timing of 49.64 at the New Clark City Aquatic Complex meant that he was 0.05s behind Chua (49.59), who claimed gold.

Personal life
Darren started as a mere water safety lesson, before taking up swimming as a career. Darren attended Temasek Polytechnic School of Applied Science in the Diploma in Veterinary Technology.

References

2000 births
Living people
Singaporean male freestyle swimmers
Singaporean male medley swimmers
Singaporean sportspeople of Chinese descent
Swimmers at the 2018 Asian Games
Medalists at the 2018 Asian Games
Asian Games medalists in swimming
Asian Games bronze medalists for Singapore
Southeast Asian Games medalists in swimming
Southeast Asian Games gold medalists for Singapore
Southeast Asian Games silver medalists for Singapore
Competitors at the 2019 Southeast Asian Games
Swimmers at the 2022 Commonwealth Games
Commonwealth Games competitors for Singapore
21st-century Singaporean people